Delores Ann Conway is an American statistician and economist known for her work on the statistics of real estate markets. She is Professor of Real Estate Economics and Statistics in the Simon Business School of the University of Rochester.

Education and career
Conway graduated in 1971 from the University of Wisconsin–Madison, with a bachelor's degree in mathematics, earning a second bachelor's degree in computer methods and statistics in 1972. She went to Stanford University for graduate study in statistics, earning a master's degree in 1975 and completing her Ph.D. in 1979. Her dissertation, Multivariate Distribution with Specified Marginals, was supervised by Ingram Olkin.

She became an assistant professor of business at the University of Chicago in 1979, as the first female faculty member in the University of Chicago Booth School of Business, and moved to the USC Marshall School of Business as an associate professor in 1985. At USC, she directed the Casden Real Estate Economics Forecast, beginning in 2004. She moved to the University of Rochester as associate dean in 2009.

Recognition
In 1997, Conway was elected as a Fellow of the American Statistical Association.

Personal life
After moving to Rochester, Conway married the president of the university, Joel Seligman.

References

External links

Year of birth missing (living people)
Living people
American statisticians
American economists
Women statisticians
American women economists
University of Wisconsin–Madison College of Letters and Science alumni
Stanford University alumni
University of Chicago faculty
University of Rochester faculty
Fellows of the American Statistical Association
21st-century American women